Republic Square is an urban park in central Austin, Texas. Located in Downtown Austin, the park features a grassy area meant for festivals and events as well as shaded areas under live oak trees. The SFC Farmers' Market meets at the square every Saturday morning.

History
Originally called "Hamilton Square", Republic Square was one of four public squares laid out in the 1839 Waller Plan of Austin by Edwin Waller. The square functioned as a normal urban park up until the mid-twentieth century when it served as a parking lot. The neighborhood surrounding the park became significant for its Mexican American residents in throughout the late 1800s and early 1900s. During the United States Bicentennial, the city of Austin transformed the square to its former glory, and was later revitalized again in 2017. Despite many physical changes, the historic heritage Auction Oaks survived and remain a centerpiece to the square till this day.

Transportation hub
Republic Square also functions as a downtown hub for the Capital Metropolitan Transportation Authority bus system, Capital MetroBus. Austin's central bus-rapid transit system, Capital MetroRapid Lines 801 and 803 share a stop next to the square (Fourth Street/Guadalupe Street for southbound buses and Fourth Street/Lavaca Street for northbound). Republic Square station provides transit travelers the option to transfer to local lines, as well as Route 20 to Austin–Bergstrom International Airport. Republic Square is also the proposed location of a new underground light rail station that will serve the Blue and Orange Lines of Capital Metro’s proposed light rail lines within the next decade. The station will be located underground on Guadalupe St from Fourth to Sixth Street.

References

External links

Parks in Austin, Texas
Urban public parks